One-Round Hogan is a lost 1927 American boxing-drama film produced and distributed by Warner Bros. and directed by Howard Bretherton. It starred Monte Blue and Leila Hyams. Blue also appears in the 1925 prequel called Hogan's Alley, written by Darryl F. Zanuck.

Turn of the 20th century boxing champ James J. Jeffries had a featured role in this movie.

Cast
Monte Blue as Robert Emmet Hogan
Leila Hyams as Helen Davis
James J. Jeffries as Tim Hogan
Frank Hagney as "Big Joe" Morgan
Tom Gallery as Ed Davis
Texas Kid as himself
Abdul the Turk as "Sniffy"
Andy Clark (uncredited)
Tom Kennedy (uncredited)

See also
List of early Warner Bros. sound and talking features

References

External links

1927 films
American silent feature films
Films based on short fiction
Films directed by Howard Bretherton
Warner Bros. films
1927 lost films
American black-and-white films
Lost American films
Lost sports drama films
American sports drama films
1920s sports drama films
1927 drama films
1920s American films
Silent American drama films
Silent sports drama films